Rhytidiopsis is a monotypic genus of mosses belonging to the family Hylocomiaceae. The only species is Rhytidiopsis robusta.

The species is found in Northern America.

References

Hypnales
Monotypic moss genera